WCFC-CA, UHF analog channel 51, was a low-powered Total Living Network owned-and-operated television station licensed to Rockford, Illinois, United States.

History 
This station started out in 1986 as a low-power satellite station of Chicago's WCFC (channel 38, now WCPX). However, when WCPX was sold to Paxson Communications in 1998, Rockford's Channel 51 became more of a full-fledged station of its own. It was later on that WCFC-CA opened its own studio facility in Rockford. In January 2001, WCFC-CA applied for and was granted a Class A broadcast license. That, in essence, upgraded the broadcasting signal, more than tripling its power.

WCFC and TLN carry selected programs from fellow religious broadcaster, the Trinity Broadcasting Network, and family-based secular programs such as Little House on the Prairie.

TLN goes cable only
On September 30, 2008, TLN relocated on Comcast from analog cable channel 15 to digital cable channel 138, then closed down WCFC-CA; the station cited that this was due to the digital transition, then scheduled for February 2009—this was despite the fact that Class A and low-powered television stations were exempt from the switchover. Following the switch to cable-only service, the station turned in its license to the FCC for cancellation.

"We remain committed to the Rockford market, but the move from broadcast to cable will allow us to make better use of our resources while continuing to provide faith and values programming to Rockford and the surrounding areas," said Jerry Rose, President of TLN. "As an organization, we believe in staying current with technology and appreciate the opportunity to do so with Comcast Digital Cable."

Defunct television stations in the United States
CFC-CA
Television channels and stations established in 1986
1986 establishments in Illinois
Television channels and stations disestablished in 2008
2008 disestablishments in Illinois
CFC-CA